A list of notable Polish politicians of the Democratic Party – demokraci.pl.

B
 Marek Belka

C
 Marek Czarnecki
 Mirosław Czech

E
 Marek Edelman

F
 Władysław Frasyniuk

G
 Bronisław Geremek

H
 Jerzy Hausner

K
 Jan Kułakowski

L
 Bogdan Lis

M
 Tadeusz Mazowiecki

O
 Janusz Onyszkiewicz

P
 Antoni Piechniczek
 Krzysztof Pusz

S
 Dorota Simonides
 Robert Smoktunowicz

W
 Jan Widacki

Ś
 Marcin Święcicki

 
Democratic